Francis McNeirny (April 25, 1828 – January 2, 1894) was an American clergyman of the Roman Catholic Church who served as Bishop of Albany from 1877 until his death in 1894.

Biography
Francis S. McNeirny was born in New York City, and received his early education at a private school run by a Mr. Sparrow, a Catholic teacher. In September 1841, he was sent to study under the Sulpicians at the College of Montreal. He graduated with distinction in 1849, and then made his theological studies at the Grand Seminary of Montreal. While still a scholastic, he served as procurator of the Grand Seminary for a year and then as professor of belles-lettres at the College of Montreal for two years.

After completing his studies, McNeirny returned to New York and was ordained to the priesthood by Archbishop John Hughes on May 21, 1842. He then worked as a curate at St. Patrick's Cathedral, and served Archbishop Hughes as his private secretary and master of ceremonies. He became chancellor of the Archdiocese of New York in 1857. He also served as pastor of St. Mary's Church in Rondout.

On December 22, 1871, McNeirny was appointed coadjutor bishop of the Diocese of Albany and titular bishop of Rhesaina by Pope Pius IX. He received his episcopal consecration on April 21, 1872, from Archbishop John McCloskey, with Bishops John Loughlin and David William Bacon serving as co-consecrators, in St. Patrick's Cathedral. He was charged with the administration of the diocese on January 18, 1874, and later succeeded Bishop John J. Conroy as the third Bishop of Albany on October 16, 1877.

Although Albany lost territory with the erection of the Diocese of Ogdensburg in 1872, McNeirny greatly increased the number of priests, churches, and parochial schools. He also secured the services of the Dominican Tertiaries, Sisters of the Good Shepherd, and Redemptorist Fathers for the diocese. One of his greatest achievements was the enlargement and completion of the Cathedral of the Immaculate Conception by the addition of an apse and the erection of new sacristies and a tower.

Bishop McNeirny died from pneumonia at his residence in Albany, aged 65.

References

1828 births
1894 deaths
Roman Catholic bishops of Albany
19th-century Roman Catholic bishops in the United States